Archibald Macintyre may refer to:

 Archibald T. MacIntyre (1822–1900), American politician and lawyer
 Archibald James Macintyre (1908–1967), British-born mathematician

See also
 Archibald McIntyre (1772–1858), American merchant and politician